Camp Holloway is a former U.S. Army base near Pleiku in central Vietnam.

History

Camp Holloway was established in 1962. It was located along Route 19 approximately 3km east of Pleiku in the Central Highlands of Vietnam. The camp was named in 1963 for Piasecki CH-21 helicopter pilot Warrant Officer Charles E. Holloway, who in December 1962 became the first aviator assigned to the 81st Transportation Company to be killed in action. 

The 81st Transportation Company, re-equipped in 1963 with Bell UH-1 Huey helicopters, later became the 119th Assault Helicopter Company. 

A Viet Cong attack in the early morning hours of February 7, 1965, killed seven, wounded 104 and destroyed 10 aircraft. This prompted U.S. President Lyndon B. Johnson to begin bombing North Vietnam.

In December 1965 the 170th Aviation Company joined with the 119th to create the 52nd Aviation Battalion. The base eventually expanded to house the headquarters of the 52d Combat Aviation Battalion, now part of the 17th Combat Aviation Group, 1st Aviation Brigade. At its peak, Camp Holloway was home to two additional UH-1 "Huey" assault helicopter companies, the 179th Aviation Support Helicopter Company Boeing CH-47A Chinook, an Cessna O-1 Bird Dog reconnaissance airplane company, a Sikorsky CH-54 Skycrane company, and other supporting units. B Troop, 7th Squadron, 17th Air Cavalry also was stationed at Camp Holloway for a period of time. In 1972 B Troop, 7/17th Air Cavalry was redesignated H Troop, 17th Cavalry Regiment.

At 02:30 on 26 January 1968 the camp was attacked by mortar fire and sappers from two companies of the People's Army of Vietnam (PAVN) 408th Sapper Battalion resulting in five UH-1 helicopters and one ammunition storage area destroyed.
 
In 1973 Camp Holloway was transferred to the Army of the Republic of Vietnam. Today it serves as a training base for the PAVN.

The following units were also here:
 43rd Signal Battalion
 2nd Battalion, 320th Artillery Regiment

References

External links
 

Installations of the United States Army in South Vietnam
Installations of the Army of the Republic of Vietnam
Pleiku
1962 establishments in South Vietnam
Military installations established in 1962